Inga bijuga is a species of plant in the family Fabaceae. It is found only in Venezuela.

References

bijuga
Endemic flora of Venezuela
Vulnerable flora of South America
Taxonomy articles created by Polbot